Chartierville is a small municipality of about 300 people in Le Haut-Saint-François Regional County Municipality, in the Estrie region of Quebec, Canada, on the Canada–United States border.

Chartierville is located on Route 257 South. Prior to its founding in 1870 by colonists from Saint-Hyacinthe, gold-seekers flocked to the area. This patch of land, 142 square kilometers (55 square miles) and 505 meters (1657 feet) in altitude, is one of the highest regions in Quebec.

Magnetic Hill
A local attraction of interest is Magnetic Hill (Côte Magnétique), a gravity hill.

References

External links
 
 Official website of the Municipality of Chartierville

Municipalities in Quebec
Incorporated places in Estrie
Le Haut-Saint-François Regional County Municipality